Viirelaid, previously also known as Paternoster, is a small island in the Baltic Sea belonging to the country of Estonia. Viirelaid lies southeast of the island of Muhu. Together with Muhu and neighbouring small islands of  Kesselaid, Võilaid and Suurlaid it forms Muhu Parish, the rural municipality within Saare County, Estonia.

The area of the island is 81 hectares. It is up to 4.5 metres above sea level and is very flat. The island served in earlier times as an orientation point for the shipping industry.

On the island is a steel lighthouse called the Viirelaiu tuletorn built in 1882 and renovated in 2004. Originally built in 1857 of timber, the structure is an 11-metre-high tower.

See also
List of islands of Estonia

References

External links
Virtsu: Viirelaiu tuletorn
Virtsu: Images of Viirelaid and the Viirelaiu Lighthouse
Viirelaiu tuletorn

Estonian islands in the Baltic
Muhu Parish